Pujŏn County (Pujŏn kun) is a city in northern South Hamgyŏng province, North Korea.

In historical contexts, Pujŏn is sometimes known as Fusen, according to its Japanese pronunciation.

The  built a secret camp on Mount Okryon in Pujŏn in the 1930s. This area was home to revolutionary activities of Kim Jong-suk during the anti-Japanese struggle. Commemorating her activities the Pujŏn Revolutionary Battle Site has been designated.

Administrative divisions
Pujŏn county is divided into 1 ŭp (town), 2 rodongjagu (workers' districts) and 14 ri (villages):

Transportation
Pujŏn county is served by the Sinhŭng line of the Korean State Railway.

Sport
It has one of the three speed skating ovals in the country.

References

External links
 Naver Encyclopedia entry

Counties of South Hamgyong